Brattle Street may refer to:

 Brattle Street (Boston, Massachusetts) (1694-1962), street in Boston located on the current site of City Hall Plaza
 Brattle Street Church, Boston
 Brattle Street (Cambridge, Massachusetts), historic street dating to before the American Revolutionary War.  Also called the "King's Highway" or "Tory Row".